The Lost Pines Power Project 1 is a natural gas fired power plant located near Bastrop, Texas in Bastrop County, Texas.  It is owned by GenTex Power Corporation, a wholly owned affiliate of the Lower Colorado River Authority.  The plant, along with Sim Gideon Power Plant, is part of the Lost Pines Power Park.  The plant was completed in 2001, and has a generating capacity of 545 megawatts provided by 2 natural gas fired gas turbines in a combined cycle configuration with one steam turbine.

See also

 List of power stations in Texas

External links
Lower Colorado River Authority page for the Lost Pines Power Project 1
Lower Colorado River Authority page for the GenTex Power Corporation

Energy infrastructure completed in 2001
Buildings and structures in Bastrop County, Texas
Natural gas-fired power stations in Texas
Lower Colorado River Authority